The Crewe by-election was a Parliamentary by-election held on 26 July 1912. The constituency returned one Member of Parliament (MP) to the House of Commons of the United Kingdom, elected by the first past the post voting system.

Vacancy
Walter McLaren had been Liberal MP for the seat of Crewe since the April 1910 By-Election. In 1912, he died causing the vacancy.

History

The Liberal party had won every election in Crewe, since the seat was created in 1885 apart from the 1895 election, when a Conservative won.

Candidates
The Liberal candidate was 30-year-old Harold Lawson Murphy, a lecturer in Political Economy in Trinity College Dublin. He had trained as a solicitor and was secretary to the Liberal Cabinet Minister, Sir John Simon.

The Unionist candidate was Ernest Craig, who had been the unsuccessful Liberal Unionist candidate here in December 1910.

The Labour party, who had not fielded a candidate in December 1910 having fielded a candidate in January 1910, decided to re-enter the contest. Their candidate was James Holmes who was a member of the Amalgamated Society of Railway Servants.

Given the intervention of the Labour party, the result of the previous three-way contest is relevant;

Result

The intervention of the Labour candidate took enough votes from the Liberal candidate to help the Unionist candidate win.

Aftermath
A General Election was due to take place by the end of 1915. By the autumn of 1914, the following candidates had been adopted to contest that election;
Unionist: Ernest Craig
Liberal: Joseph Davies
Following the by-election the Labour party decided to re-adopt Holmes as their prospective parliamentary candidate. The National Union of Railwaymen agreed to be his sponsor. However Holmes was concerned that another election where the progressive vote was split would result in another Unionist victory. He called for the Labour and Liberal parties to come to some sort of electoral arrangement as had been the practice in the past. In response, the Labour party decided to drop him as prospective candidate.
Due to the outbreak of war, the election never took place.
Joseph Davies, who had been adopted as Liberal candidate back in 1913 was a supporter of David Lloyd George and in 1918 was granted the 'Coalition Coupon'. As a result, Ernest Craig withdrew and did not defend the seat he had won 6 years earlier.

References

 Craig, F. W. S. (1974). British parliamentary election results 1885-1918 (1 ed.). London: Macmillan.
 The Social and Economic Development of Crewe, 1780-1923 by William Henry Chaloner [1950]
 The Socialist review - Volume 10 - [1913] 
 Wikipedia: en.wikipedia.org
 Who's Who: www.ukwhoswho.com
 Debrett's House of Commons 1916

1912 elections in the United Kingdom
1912 in England
20th century in Cheshire
By-elections to the Parliament of the United Kingdom in Cheshire constituencies
Crewe